Nightmare Vacation may refer to:

 Nightmare Vacation (album), 2020 album by American rapper Rico Nasty
 Sleepaway Camp, 1983 slasher film released in the UK as Nightmare Vacation
 Sleepaway Camp II: Unhappy Campers, the 1988 squeal released in the UK as Nightmare Vacation II
 Sleepaway Camp III: Teenage Wasteland, the 1989 squeal released in the UK as Nightmare Vacation III